The 242nd Battalion, CEF was a unit in the Canadian Expeditionary Force during the First World War.  Based in Montreal, Quebec, the unit began recruiting sometime in mid-1916 in Montreal and the surrounding district.  The unit was absorbed into the Canadian Forestry Corps while still in Canada.  The 242nd Battalion, CEF had one Officer Commanding: Lieut-Col. J. B. White.

References
Meek, John F. Over the Top! The Canadian Infantry in the First World War. Orangeville, Ont.: The Author, 1971.

Battalions of the Canadian Expeditionary Force